Robert Meyn (16 January 1896 – 2 March 1972) was a German stage, film and television actor.

Partial filmography

 The Sinner (1951) - Von Hernsdorf - Marinas Stiefvater / Marina's Stepfather
 Kommen Sie am Ersten (1951) - Dr. Brand
 Klettermaxe (1952) - Reuping, Theaterdirektor
 Captain Bay-Bay (1953) - Zollkommandant
 The Last Bridge (1954) - Stabsartz Dr. Rottsieper
 Three from Variety (1954)
 Ludwig II (1955) - Professor Dr. Gudden
 The Devil's General (1955) - Generalleutnant von Stetten
 Jackboot Mutiny (1955) - (uncredited)
 Island of the Dead (1955) - Kapitän
 Three Girls from the Rhine (1955) - Philipp Drechsler
 In Hamburg When the Nights Are Long (1956)
 Devil in Silk (1956) - Untersuchungsrichter
 Ich suche Dich (1956) - Appel
 The Captain from Köpenick (1956) - Polizeipräsident von Jagow
 Skandal um Dr. Vlimmen (1956) - Stadtrat van der Kalk
 The Story of Anastasia (1956) - Deutscher Rechtsanwalt
 Three Birch Trees on the Heath (1956) - Rackebrand, Forstmeister
 Glücksritter (1957) - Direktor Schomberg
 Confessions of Felix Krull (1957) - 1. Polizeibeamter
 Es wird alles wieder gut (1957)
 Doctor Crippen Lives (1958) - Chefinspektor Smith
 Endangered Girls (1958) - Maulbeck, Kriminalkommissar
 Night Nurse Ingeborg (1958)
 Schmutziger Engel (1958) - Strafverteidiger
 Grabenplatz 17 (1958) - Kriminalrat Sasse
 Blitzmädels an die Front (1958) - General der Flieger
 The Muzzle (1958) - Oberstaatsanwalt
 Thirteen Old Donkeys (1958) - Ess
 Father, Mother and Nine Children (1958)
 The Man Who Sold Himself (1959) - Herr Stückli
 Court Martial (1959) - Admiral Zirler
 The Rest Is Silence (1959) - Dr. Voltman
 Professor Columbus (1968)
 Seven Days Grace (1969) - Direktor
 Percy Stuart (1969-1970, TV Series) - Sir John Cleveland
 Heintje - Einmal wird die Sonne wieder scheinen (1970)

References

Bibliography 
Fehrenbach, Heide. Cinema in Democratizing Germany: Reconstructing National Identity After Hitler. University of North Carolina Press, 1995.

External links 

German male film actors
German male television actors
German male stage actors
1896 births
1972 deaths